Ronaldo Shani (born 29 March 2002) is a Greek professional footballer who plays as a forward for Super League 2 club Thesprotos. He was included in The Guardian's "Next Generation 2019".

Career statistics

Club

References

2002 births
Greek people of Albanian descent
Living people
Greek footballers
Greece youth international footballers
Association football forwards
Atromitos F.C. players
Asteras Vlachioti F.C. players
Super League Greece 2 players
Hessenliga players
Greek expatriate footballers
Expatriate footballers in Germany
Greek expatriate sportspeople in Germany